High Country Press is an American, English language daily online, and formerly weekly print, news publication based in Boone, North Carolina. The newspaper was founded May 5, 2005 by current editor and publisher Ken Ketchie. The newspaper serves Watauga County and Avery County in northwestern North Carolina. On Feb. 29, 2012 the newspaper made the transition to the World Wide Web.

The newspaper staff also produces High Country Magazine seven times per year and the seasonal High Country Visitor Guide.

The staff has won multiple awards in recent years, including first place in the 2010 North Carolina Press Association Journalism Contest for News Coverage – Community Division (circulation over 10,000) and second place in the General Excellence for Web Sites category in that same division.

See also
 List of newspapers in North Carolina

References

External links

Daily newspapers published in North Carolina
Boone, North Carolina
2005 establishments in North Carolina